Peltophorum dasyrhachis is a deciduous flowering tree growing to 30 meters. It is native to Southeast Asia (Cambodia, Indonesia, Laos, Malaysia, Thailand, Vietnam) and introduced to Africa (Ivory Coast, Sierra Leone, Tanzania, Uganda). It produces drooping racemes of fragile yellow flowers that bloom in Thailand in early March.

References
Gardner, S.; Sidisunthorn, P.; Anusarnsunthorn, V:  A Field Guide to Forest Trees of Northern Thailand. October 2007, pg. 174.  Kobfai Publishing Project, Bangkok, Thailand. 
International Legume Database & Information Service retrieved on 9 March 2009

dasyrhachis
Trees of Indo-China
Trees of Malesia
Fabales of Asia